Daniel Alexander may refer to:

 Danny Alexander (born 1972), Scottish politician
 Daniel Alexander (basketball) (born 1991), American basketball player
 Daniel Asher Alexander (1768–1846), English architect and engineer
 Daniel Robert Alexander (1859–?), American settler and trader in Ethiopia

See also 
 Dan Alexander (disambiguation)